The Central Departmental training sports and entertainment complex (CDFAS) is a sports complex located in the Val d'Oise in the communes of Eaubonne and of Saint-Gratien.  Built in a park of seven hectares, it was constructed by the general Council with the help of the Region Ile-de-France and is managed by a public service delegation.

Overview

Funding 
The funding came from: 
 General Council of the Val-d'Oise 148 million francs (83%);
 Regional Council of Ile-de-France: CHF 30 million (17%).

Description 
The CDFA was constructed in two stages in the first half of the 1990s.  Buildings constructed in 1993 are:
 the Jean Bouvelle  House in which are the offices of sports departmental committees, those of the Olympic and Sport departmental committee (CDOS) and a conference room in three modular classrooms

The second phase of construction was completed in late 1995. It consists of: 

 the visitor center including administrative offices, boarding, space and catering kitchen, classrooms and meetings and local sports medicine with sauna.
 outdoor sports facilities: fields for rugby, American Football, fields for lancers, for tennis and indoor parking.
 The Stadium Michel Hidalgo and a intercommunal pool of Bussys complete the complex. The structure is a very versatile sporting complex, meeting the needs of the sporting world for training camps or training for demonstrations, seminars, and conferences.

Management and administration 
The General Council of Val d'Oise delegates management of the CDFA by tender.  The current beneficiary is an association called CDFAS Management Association.  The administration is under the authority of a director. The administrative, technical and maintenance are provided by 32 other budget items.

Operation 
The CDFA hosts occasional courses, permanent centers and major sports and / or media events.

Internships 
The CDFA welcomes, as a priority, internships in the departmental committees of the Val d'Oise and leagues Ile-de-France but remains open to requests from national federations, international and other organizations; it also hosts events at the request of various organizations and businesses.

Centers 
The CDFA currently hosts four under 21s regional training teams: Athletics (8 trainees in 2012), women's basketball (14 trainees in 2012), American football (14 trainees in 2012) and Handball (24 trainees in 2012). Young athletes are enrolled in local institutions with flexible hours allowing for practice and high-level training with federal coaches. They are under the permanent responsibility of 3 boarding masters.

The events 
Major events are hosted at CDFA.  It has hosted: 
 several successive editions of the World Championships table football (foosball) 
 the challenge Pierre Tiby, a European junior championship of handball held there regularly
 a traditional indoor international athletics meeting. (Since 2012 that meeting has given way to the first edition of the female track meet of Val d'Oise, a meeting of international women's only athletics).

The CDFA in a few numbers 
In 2012, 197,578 spectators have attended CDFAS events, for 38,831 hours facilities were in use, 64,149 meals have been served and 28,973 overnight accommodations provided. For the same year the budget was 3,688,916 € of which 1,832,807 came from the General Council.

See also 
Another Athletic Hall by the name of Stephane-Diagana in Lyon

Notes and references

External links 
 http://www.cdfas.com/

Handball venues in France
Athletics (track and field) venues in France
Sports venues in Val-d'Oise
Sports complexes